Zheng Feifei (born 8 June 1996) is a Chinese Paralympic powerlifter. She won the silver medal in the women's 86 kg event at the 2020 Summer Paralympics held in Tokyo, Japan. A few months later, she won the silver medal in her event at the 2021 World Para Powerlifting Championships held in Tbilisi, Georgia.

References

External links
 

1996 births
Living people
Chinese powerlifters
Female powerlifters
Paralympic powerlifters of China
Paralympic silver medalists for China
Paralympic medalists in powerlifting
Powerlifters at the 2020 Summer Paralympics
Medalists at the 2020 Summer Paralympics
Sportspeople from Handan
21st-century Chinese women